Temptations is the third studio album by American hip hop group Freestyle Fellowship. It was released on Ground Control Records on October 16, 2001. Its release was delayed considerably because of Self Jupiter's incarceration.

Critical reception

Dan LeRoy of AllMusic gave the album 2 stars out of 5, saying, "the uncompromising attitude spelled out in the song 'No Hooks No Chorus' ends up hurting the album, as too many tracks focus almost exclusively on the lyrical end of the hip-hop equation, backing the group's rhymes with raw, repetitive grooves." Brad Haywood of Pitchfork gave the album a 6.6 out of 10, calling it "a disappointing one." Dave Tompkins of Vibe said, "While the Fellowship can still run crop circles around other rappers, Temptations sounds as if each of their distinctive egos were in a different space."

Track listing

References

External links
 

2001 albums
Freestyle Fellowship albums